The Chandigarh Police is the law enforcement agency for the Union Territory of Chandigarh in India. Chandigarh Police has its headquarters in sector 9 D, Chandigarh. The head of the state police is the Director General of Police of Chandigarh. The current DGP of Chandigarh is Sh. Praveer Ranjan, AGMUT Cadre. Chandigarh has the highest police density as compared to all other states and Union Territories across India. , there are 5295.6 policemen per 100 km² area in Chandigarh.

Organizational structure
Chandigarh Police comes under the administrative control of the Department of Home, Chandigarh administration. The department is headed by the Home Secretary of Chandigarh. The Head of Police Force is the Director General of Police. There are 5 major SP/SSP ranked posts in Chandigarh Police which are headed by various IPS officers. They report to the DIG, Chandigarh, who in turns report to the IG, Chandigarh. The Police force is manned by IPS officers of the AGMUT cadre, however, the posts of SSP/UT and SSP/Traffic and Security are usually filled in by officers of Punjab and Haryana Cadre who are in deputation to the AGMUT Cadre.

References

External links
 Chandigarh Police official page

Government of Chandigarh
State law enforcement agencies of India
Government agencies with year of establishment missing